H2A, H-2A or H-IIA can refer to:

Histone H2A, a component of DNA higher structure in eukaryotic cells
H-IIA, a family of Japanese rockets.
H-2A Visa, a temporary, nonimmigrant visa allowing foreign nationals entry into the U.S. for seasonal agricultural work.